The International Physics and Culture Olympiad (IPhCO) is a physics and culture competition for high school students. In June 2016, the IPhCO beta version was held in Curitiba, Brazil at the Federal Institute of Paraná (IFPR). The first IPhCO was held in April 2017.

Questions 
Questions are based on high school physics and mathematics, but interconnect with areas such as Geography, History, Arts and Biology. During the online competition students gain access to 10 questions in total and have 24 hours to answer each question. Always at midnight, a new portal is released.

Awards 
Students can be awarded three times during the competition, according to their score. Each award is related to a number of questions answered successfully and to a postcard with an IPhCO key - copper, silver or gold.

Cultural exchange 
An important goal of the Olympiad is to value culture, arousing young people's interest in the history of Brazil and other countries. To do so, the Olympiad takes students on virtual tours, where interesting events can be addressed. Aiming on offering more visibility to cultural places in Curitiba and the state of Paraná, the Olympiad team began to map places that were not yet in Street View, collaborating with Google.

Headquarters 
The main venue of the Olympiad is in Curitiba, Parana, where the Olympiad began in 2017. In the next years, other cities in Brazil and the world are expected to join the IPhCO network.

References

 ASHBURN, E., & FLODEN, R. Meaningful Learning Using Technology-What Educators Need to Know and Do, New York: Teachers College Press, 2006. 
 BATES, A. W. Technology, open learning and distance education, New York: Routledge, 1995. 
 FOUREZ, G. Crise no ensino de ciências? Investigações em Ensino de Ciências, Porto Alegre, v. 8, n. 2, p. 109-123, 2003.
 LEMKE, J. L. Research for the future of science education: new ways of learning, new ways of living. In: INTERNATIONAL CONGRESS ON RESEARCH IN SCIENCE TEACHING, 7., 2005, Granada. Anais... Granada: [s. n.], 2005.
 VIANNA, J.D.M.,  SIQUEIRA, F.F.A. Olimpíadas de Física. Física na Escola, v.5, n.2, 2004.

External links
official website

Brazil education-related lists
Science competitions
International Science Olympiad